Frederick Willi Wadsworth (born July 17, 1962) is an American professional golfer who played on the PGA Tour and South Africa's Sunshine Tour. 

Wadsworth was born in Munich, Germany and grew up in Columbia, South Carolina. He attended the University of South Carolina. He turned professional in 1984. 

Wadsworth was a Monday qualifier who won a PGA Tour event, seven months after Kenny Knox did the same to win the Honda Classic. His victory came at the 1986 Southern Open when he shot a final round 67 to finish at 11-under-par 269 to win by two strokes over four other golfers. The victory gave Wadsworth a two-year exemption. He played poorly in the 1987 and 1988 seasons producing only one top-10 in 66 events. Failing to maintain his PGA Tour card, Wadsworth played on the South African Tour in 1989. He won the tour's most prestigious event, the South African Open, defeating fellow American and future star Tom Lehman. In the 1990s, he played primarily on the Ben Hogan Tour in an effort to get back on the PGA Tour. He did not do very well, recording only two top-10s despite playing in over 100 events.

Wadsworth lives in Columbia, South Carolina.

Amateur wins (1)
1984 Eastern Amateur

Professional wins (2)

PGA Tour wins (1)

Sunshine Tour wins (1)
1989 Protea Assurance South African Open

Results in major championships

Note: Wadsworth never played in The Open Championship.

CUT = missed the half-way cut
"T" = tied

See also
2000 PGA Tour Qualifying School graduates

References

External links

American male golfers
South Carolina Gamecocks men's golfers
PGA Tour golfers
Golfers from South Carolina
Sportspeople from Munich
Sportspeople from Columbia, South Carolina
Sportspeople from Columbus, Georgia
1962 births
Living people